Concordia is a town and municipality in the Colombian department of Antioquia. Part of the subregion of Southwestern Antioquia.

This municipality is located at 2000 mt over sea level 6° 2'59.82"N 75°55'11.88"W. Has a population of 25,000 including the surrounding areas. The inhabitants of this mountains survives mainly from the coffee trade.

It was founded in 1830 by Juan José Restrepo Uribe, and originally named as Selva Virgen (Virgin Jungle), it was later renamed La Comia.

References
  Concordia official website

Municipalities of Antioquia Department
Populated places established in 1830
1830 establishments in Gran Colombia